Non Sombun is a sub-district (tambon) in Mueang Bueng Kan District, Bueng Kan Province, far northeastern Thailand. As of 2012, it has a population of 9,903 people. It lies on Thailand Route 222, south of Bueng Kan.

History
The sub-district was created in 1968, when 12 administrative villages were split from Bueng Kan Sub-district to form the new sub-district. In 1978 the sub-district Na Sawan was split off from Non Sombun.

Administration
The sub-district is divided into 13 administrative villages. Non Sombun sub-district administrative organization is the local government responsible for the subdistrict, covering the same area as the sub-district.

References

External links
ThaiTambon.com

Tambon of Bueng Kan province
Populated places in Bueng Kan province
Mueang Bueng Kan District